Marleen Lohse (born  February 28, 1984 in Soltau) is a German actress.

Education 
Lohse completed her abitur and in 2006 moved to Berlin, completing a diploma course in Acting at the Hochschule für Film und Fernsehen Konrad Wolf in Potsdam from 2006 to 2010.

Acting career 
Marleen Lohse began acting in television series and films at the age of 12, and played the character Julia "Hexe" Clement in the children's series Die Kinder vom Alstertal from 1998 to 2002.

After completing school, Lohse continued acting appearing in Wilde Jungs (2004) and in the television series Stolberg and Leipzig Homicide and in the Tatort episodes Roter Tod (2007) and Schatten der Angst (2008).

Lohse has played in some films directed by Erik Schmitt. She was co-author of the screenplay for the short film Berlin Metanoia. In his first feature-length film, Cleo, which had its premiere in 2019 at the 69th Berlin International Film Festival in the category Generation, she played the title role.

In 2013, Lohse appeared in the video Where You Stand from the band Travis, and in 2016 in the video Protected from the band Keøma.

Filmography 
 1997: Neues vom Süderhof (television series, episode Stress für Carla)
 1998–2004: Die Kinder vom Alstertal (television series, 44 episodes)
 1999: Ich bin kein Mann für eine Frau (television film)
 2002: Hallo Robbie! (television series, episode S.O.S. für Robbie)
 2002–2007: Die Rettungsflieger (television series, 3 episodes)
 2003: Küssen verboten, Baggern erlaubt
 2004: Wilde Jungs (television series, episode Die Auktion)
 2004: Die Albertis (television series, episode Denn sie wissen nicht, was tun)
 2005: SOKO Wismar (television series, episode Der Zinker)
 2006: Chinese Take Away (short film)
 2006: Elsas Geburtstag (short film)
 2006: KRIMI.DE (television series, episode Unter Druck)
 2006–2009: Leipzig Homicide (television series, 6 episodes)
 2007: Memory Effect (short film)
 2007: Sechs tote Studenten
 2007: Tatort – Roter Tod
 2007: Vollidiot
 2007, 2009: Notruf Hafenkante (television series, 2 episodes)
 2008: Mordshunger
 2008: Tatort – Schatten der Angst
 2008: Die Pfefferkörner (television series, episode Abgezockt)
 2008: Die Gerichtsmedizinerin (television series, episode Schlaf Kindlein, schlaf)
 2008: Das tapfere Schneiderlein
 2008, 2014: Küstenwache (television series, 2 episodes)
 2009: Résiste – Aufstand der Praktikanten
 2009: Diamantenhochzeit
 2009: 
 2010: Stolberg (television series, episode Eine Frage der Ehre)
 2010, 2012: Stuttgart Homicide (television series, 2 episodes)
 2010: Inga Lindström – Prinzessin des Herzens
 2010: 
 2010: Deadline – Jede Sekunde zählt (television series, episode Schlafende Hunde)
 2011: Countdown – Die Jagd beginnt (television series, episode Singles)
 2011: 
 2011: Cologne P.D. (television series, episode Früchte des Zorns)
 2011: 205 – Room of Fear
 2012: Die Tote ohne Alibi
 2012: Der Cop und der Snob (television series, episode Der Morgen danach)
 2012: Tsunami – Das Leben danach
 2012: 
 2013: Nashorn im Galopp (short film)
 2013: Der Staatsanwalt (television series, episode Mitten ins Herz)
 2013: Frau Ella
 2013: Frauen, die Geschichte machten (documentary series, episode Elisabeth I. – Verheiratet mit England)
 2013: Großstadtrevier (television series, episode Das Phantom)
 2013: The Fifth Estate
 2013: Mordshunger − Verbrechen und andere Delikatessen (television mini-series, 2 episodes)
 2014: TVLab (television series, episode Alibi Agentur)
 2014: Die Familiendetektivin (television series, episode Mütter)
 2014: Letzte Spur Berlin (television series, episode Durchleuchtet)
 2014: The Old Fox (television series, episode Ein langsamer Tod)
 seit 2014: Nord bei Nordwest (television series)
 2014: Käpt’n Hook
 2015: Der wilde Sven
 2017: Estonia
 2017: Der Transport
 2018: Sandy
 2018: Waidmannsheil
 2019: Gold!
 2019: Frau Irmler
 2020: Dinge des Lebens
 2015–2017: Im Knast (television series)
 2015: Zum Sterben zu früh
 2016: Berlin Metanoia (short film)
 2016: Santa Maria (short film)
 2016: Sanft schläft der Tod
 2016:  –  (television series)
 2016: Der mit dem Schlag
 2017: Happy Burnout
 2017: Blaumacher (television series, episode Der Mann im Haus)
 2018: MANN/FRAU (mini-series)
 2019: Ein starkes Team (television series, episode Eiskalt)
 2019: Cleo

Music
Lohse is a songwriter for the musical duo Unsereins, in which she plays guitar and sings with Julius Hartog. Unsereins was chosen to perform at the 2015 Shortkicks Gala short-film competition.

Private life 
Marleen Lohse's parents run a hairdresser salon in St. Georg, Hamburg.

External links 

 
 Website of the agency

References 

1984 births
Living people
People from Heidekreis
German actresses